Tendaguria (meaning "the Tendaguru one") is a genus of herbivorous sauropod dinosaur from the Late Jurassic of Lindi Region, Tanzania.

Discovery and naming
In 1911, German geologist Wilhelm Bornhardt at Nambango in German East Africa discovered two sauropod vertebrae, fifteen kilometers (nine miles) southeast of Tendaguru Hill. These were described by Werner Janensch in 1929 but not named.

The finds were formally named by José Fernando Bonaparte, Wolf-Dieter Heinrich and Rupert Wild in 2000. The type species is Tendaguria tanzaniensis Bonaparte, Heinrich & Wild 2000. The generic name refers to the Tendaguru, the area of the great German palaeontological expeditions between 1909 and 1912. The specific name was "after Tanzania, the country where the holotype was collected". The territory of present Tanzania largely coincides with that of the former German East Africa.

The type specimen consists of two syntypes, MB.R.2092.1 (NB4) and MB.R.2092.2 (NB5), probably uncovered in the Upper Saurian Bed (Obere Dinosauriermergel), Tendaguru Series, dating from the Late Jurassic Tithonian. The specimens are two anterior dorsal vertebrae, part of the collection of the Berlin's Natural History Museum. They probably belong to the same individual, having been found at a short distance from each other.

Description
Tendaguria was a large sauropod from the Tendaguru fossil locality. Its length is estimated at about twenty meters (sixty-six feet). The vertebrae are opisthocoelous (convex at the front, hollow behind) and differ from other known sauropods in their very low, almost non-existent neural spines, which are not distinct bodies of bone, do not rise above the surrounding area of the neural arch and are continuous at their rear with the transverse processes, including the epipophyses. Viewed from above, the spines have the form of a low and broad transverse ridge. Tendaguria is thus a highly derived or apomorphic sauropod; the axial musculature probably shifted from the neural spines to the dorsal surface of the transverse processes. Other autapomorphies are: a depression in the upper part of the outer side of each prezygapophysis; deep depressions in the front side of the transverse processes combined with shallow depressions in the rear side; the possession of robust epipophyses.

Classification
Due to its unique morphology, Tendaguria defied classification in the original description, where the authors placed it as Sauropoda incertae sedis, though also naming a separate Tendaguriidae. It shows a mix of basal and derived traits, indicating a position outside, respectively inside, Neosauropoda. A cervical vertebra referred to Tendaguria because of a similar low spine shows some similarities to Camarasaurus. In 2014 it was included in a cladogram generated in the redescription of Diamantinasaurus, where it was placed as the sister to Wintonotitan within Somphospondyli.

Mannion (2019) and Mannion et al. (2019) assign Tendaguria to Turiasauria based on comparative anatomy and a phylogenetic analysis where it is recovered as the sister taxon of Moabosaurus within the Turiasauria.

References

External links
Dinosauria Translation and Pronunciation Guide

Turiasauria
Late Jurassic dinosaurs of Africa
Macronarians
Fossil taxa described in 2000
Taxa named by José Bonaparte